Jerry Jeff Walker (born Ronald Clyde Crosby; March 16, 1942 – October 23, 2020) was an American country music and folk singer-songwriter. He was a leading figure in the progressive country and  outlaw country music movement. He was best known for having written the 1968 song "Mr. Bojangles".

Early life
Walker was born Ronald Clyde Crosby in Oneonta, New York, on March 16, 1942.  His father, Mel, worked as a sports referee and bartender; his mother, Alma (Conrow), was a housewife. His maternal grandparents played for square dances in the Oneonta area – his grandmother, Jessie Conrow, playing piano, while his grandfather played fiddle. During the late 1950s, Crosby was a member of a local Oneonta teen band called The Tones.

After high school, Crosby joined the National Guard, but his thirst for adventure led him to go AWOL and he was eventually discharged.  He went on to roam the country busking for a living in New Orleans and throughout Texas, Florida, and New York, often accompanied by H. R. Stoneback (a friendship referenced in 1970's "Stoney"). He first played under the stage name of Jerry Ferris, then Jeff Walker, before amalgamating them into Jerry Jeff Walker and legally changing his name to that in the late 1960s.

Career
Walker spent his early folk music days in Greenwich Village in the mid-1960s. He co-founded a band with Bob Bruno in the late-1960s called Circus Maximus that put out two albums, one with the popular FM radio hit "Wind", but Bruno's interest in jazz apparently diverged from Walker's interest in folk music. Walker thus resumed his solo career and recorded the seminal 1968 album Mr. Bojangles with the help of David Bromberg and other influential Atlantic recording artists.  He settled in Austin, Texas, in the 1970s, associating mainly with the outlaw country scene that included artists such as Michael Martin Murphey, Willie Nelson, Guy Clark, Waylon Jennings, and Townes Van Zandt.  "Jerry Jeff's train songs" were cited in the lyrics of Jennings and Nelson's 1977 hit song "Luckenbach, Texas (Back to the Basics of Love)". On September 28, 1974, Walker appeared with Doug Sahm at Carnegie Hall's Main Hall.

A string of records for MCA and Elektra followed Walker's move to Austin, Texas, before he gave up on the mainstream music business and formed his own independent record label. Tried & True Music was founded in 1986, with his wife Susan as president and manager. Susan also founded Goodknight Music as his management company and Tried & True Artists for his bookings. A series of increasingly autobiographical records followed under the Tried & True imprint, which also sells his autobiography, Gypsy Songman.  In 2004, Walker released his first DVD of songs from his past performed in an intimate setting in Austin.

Walker married Susan Streit in 1974 in Travis County, Texas. They had two children: a son, Django Walker, who is also a musician, and a daughter Jessie Jane. Walker had a retreat on Ambergris Caye in Belize, where he recorded his Cowboy Boots and Bathing Suits album in 1998. He also made a guest appearance on Ramblin' Jack Elliott's 1998 album of duets Friends of Mine, singing "He Was a Friend of Mine" and Woody Guthrie's "Hard Travelin'".

Walker recorded songs written by others such as "LA Freeway" (Guy Clark), "Up Against the Wall Redneck Mother" (Ray Wylie Hubbard), "(Looking for) The Heart of Saturday Night" (Tom Waits), and "London Homesick Blues" (Gary P. Nunn). He also interpreted the songs of others such as Rodney Crowell, Townes Van Zandt, Paul Siebel, Bob Dylan, Todd Snider, Dave Roberts, and even a rodeo clown named Billy Jim Baker. Walker was given the moniker of "the Jimmy Buffett of Texas". It was Walker who first drove Jimmy Buffett to Key West (from Coconut Grove, Florida in a Packard).  The two musicians also co-wrote the song "Railroad Lady" while riding the last run of the Panama Limited.

"Mr. Bojangles"
Walker's "Mr. Bojangles" (1968) is perhaps his best-known and most-often covered song. It is about an obscure alcoholic but talented tap-dancing drifter Walker had met who, when arrested and jailed in New Orleans, insisted on being identified only as "Bojangles" (taken, presumably, from famed tap dancer Bill Robinson, leading to erroneous speculation that Robinson was the subject of the song).

Notable covers of the song include a live version by his bandmate Bromberg on his album Demon in Disguise, a single by the Nitty Gritty Dirt Band that charted at number 9 on the Billboard Hot 100 in 1971 (also released on their album Uncle Charlie & His Dog Teddy). and its inclusion in medley on the 1974 debut self-titled album by Jim Stafford.

Later years and death
Walker had an annual birthday celebration in Austin at the Paramount Theatre and at Gruene Hall in Gruene, Texas. This party became an enormous event in Texas and brought some of the biggest names in country music out for a night of picking and swapping stories. 

He died from throat cancer on October 23, 2020, at a hospital in Austin, Texas  at the age of 78.

Discography

Albums
Source: AllMusic

Singles
Source: AllMusic, unless otherwise stated.

Notes

References

External links

 JerryJeff.com
 
 
 Unofficial Jerry Jeff Walker Fan Page
 "Local '50s band almost made it big", Mark Simonson, The Daily Star, Oct 1, 2001
 "Official Documentary Film on Jerry Jeff Walker's Life"

1942 births
2020 deaths
20th-century American guitarists
20th-century American singers
21st-century American singers
American country guitarists
American country singer-songwriters
American folk singers
American male guitarists
American male singer-songwriters
American street performers
Atco Records artists
Coral Reefer Band members
Country musicians from New York (state)
Country musicians from Texas
Deaths from cancer in Texas
Deaths from throat cancer
Guitarists from New York (state)
Guitarists from Texas
Musicians from Austin, Texas
Musicians from New Braunfels, Texas
New York National Guard personnel
People from Oneonta, New York
Singer-songwriters from Texas
Singer-songwriters from New York (state)
20th-century American male singers
21st-century American male singers